Serguei Fofanoff (born 11 December 1968) is a Brazilian equestrian. He competed at the 1992 Summer Olympics, the 1996 Summer Olympics, the 2000 Summer Olympics and the 2012 Summer Olympics.

Of Russian origin, Fofanoff's grandfather was a member of the cavalry who fought Bolsheviks forces during the Russian Revolution in 1917.

References

1968 births
Living people
Brazilian male equestrians
Olympic equestrians of Brazil
Equestrians at the 1992 Summer Olympics
Equestrians at the 1996 Summer Olympics
Equestrians at the 2000 Summer Olympics
Equestrians at the 2012 Summer Olympics
Equestrians at the 1995 Pan American Games
Equestrians at the 1999 Pan American Games
Equestrians at the 2007 Pan American Games
Equestrians at the 2011 Pan American Games
Pan American Games medalists in equestrian
Pan American Games gold medalists for Brazil
Pan American Games silver medalists for Brazil
Pan American Games bronze medalists for Brazil
Sportspeople from São Paulo (state)
Brazilian people of Russian descent
Medalists at the 2011 Pan American Games
20th-century Brazilian people
21st-century Brazilian people